Kemeshk (also Romanized as Kameshk, Kamshak, and Kemishk; also known as Qamīsk) is a village in Faramarzan Rural District, Jenah District, Bastak County, Hormozgan Province, Iran. At the 2006 census, its population was 2,977, in 591 families.

References 

Populated places in Bastak County